Sihla is a village and municipality in Brezno District, in the Banská Bystrica Region of central Slovakia.

References

External links
Official homepage
http://www.e-obce.sk/obec/sihla/sihla.html

Villages and municipalities in Brezno District